Stadion Miejski im. gen. Kazimierza Sosnkowskiego (English: General Kazimierz Sosnkowski Municipal Stadium) or Stadion Polonii Warszawa (English: Polonia Warsaw Stadium), known colloquially as K6, is a multi-purpose stadium in Warsaw, Poland.

It is currently used mostly for football matches, and is the home ground of Polonia Warsaw. The stadium was originally built in 1928. The East stand was thoroughly modernized in 2004.

The stadium was used as a training ground for UEFA Euro 2012, and is being upgraded to hold a larger audience. It currently holds 7,150 seats, subdivided as follows.

Stadium stands
 The main stand (capacity: 4,889 seats) is the best seating for any sports event held at the stadium, fully covered and considerably high.
 The east stand (concrete; capacity: 1,911 seats), popularly called trybuna kamienna (the "stone stand"), is the historic stand with steps made of stone, originally with standing room only. In 2004, the stand was fully reconstructed with overhead cover and the symbolic 1,911 seats, commemorating the date of the founding of the club.
 The special guests' sector (capacity: 350 seats). Originally built for around 500 persons, in August 2009 it was fitted with only 350 seats. The sector lies at the north side of the stadium, near the ul. Międzyparkowa (street).

Additional tenants
Since 2013 the stadium is a home venue for American football team Warsaw Eagles.

It is also a home for the Polonia Warsaw reserve team.

Gallery

References

 Polonia Warszawa, 2010 official website
 Ekstraklasa venues

Polonia Warsaw
Miejski
Multi-purpose stadiums in Poland
Sports venues in Warsaw
American football venues in Poland
1928 establishments in Poland
Sports venues completed in 1928